Antonio Delgado Palomo (20 September 1957 – 1 April 2021), also known as Antonio Delgado, was a track and field athlete from Spain.  He had a disability.  He competed at the 1976 Summer Paralympics, winning a gold medal in 100 metre race and first in the long jump.

He was born in Seville on 20 September 1957 and died on 1 April 2021 at the age of 63 from throat cancer.

References

External links 
 
 

1957 births
2021 deaths
Sportspeople from Seville
Spanish disability athletes
Spanish male sprinters
Spanish male long jumpers
Paralympic athletes of Spain
Paralympic gold medalists for Spain
Paralympic silver medalists for Spain
Paralympic bronze medalists for Spain
Paralympic medalists in athletics (track and field)
Athletes (track and field) at the 1976 Summer Paralympics
Medalists at the 1976 Summer Paralympics
Deaths from throat cancer